Darren Dunstan is a Canadian-American voice actor and director based in New York City. He has provided voice-over and voice direction on several properties of 4Kids TV, as well as DuArt Film and Video. Dunstan's most notable roles include Maximillion Pegasus in the English dub version of Yu-Gi-Oh!, and Splinter in the 2003 TV series of Teenage Mutant Ninja Turtles.

Filmography

Anime

Film

Animation

Video games

References

External links

 
 
 

1976 births
Living people
Canadian voice directors
Canadian casting directors
Canadian male stage actors
Canadian male video game actors
Canadian male voice actors
Male actors from Toronto
Canadian emigrants to the United States